The table below shows all results of M-Sport World Rally Team in World Rally Championship.

WRC results

* Season still in progress.

WRC-2 results

* Season still in progress.

WRC-2 Pro results

Notes

References

 results at juwra.com

External links

results
World Rally Championship constructor results